The following lists events that happened during 2013 in Libya.

Incumbents
Prime Minister: Ali Zeidan

Events

January
 January 14 - A police officer is wounded after a grenade attack in Benghazi, as Italy announces the temporary withdrawal of the country's consulate in the city after an unsuccessful attack against the consul two days earlier.
 January 24 - The Foreign and Commonwealth Office urges British nationals to leave Benghazi immediately due to a "specific and imminent" threat to Westerners.

 
2010s in Libya
Libya
Libya
Years of the 21st century in Libya